"I'm on My Way" is a 1978 song by Captain & Tennille.  It is a track on their LP Dream.  The single was released a month prior to the release of the LP. Songwriter Mark Safan first released his version of the song in 1976 on Warner Bros. Records.

The song became a hit in the U.S. on the Pop, Country and Adult Contemporary charts.  It reached number 74 on the U.S. Billboard Hot 100, also made a minor showing on the Country chart. It did best on the Adult Contemporary chart, peaking at number 6 in the U.S. as well as number 13 in Canada.

Record World called it "a light rockabilly tune with a seasonal hook and a good vocal by Toni."

A version by Andrew Gold was included on his 1978 LP All This and Heaven Too, which was issued as a single on Asylum Records one week prior to the release of Captain & Tennille's single.

Chart history

References

External links
 
 

1976 songs
1978 singles
Andrew Gold songs
Captain & Tennille songs
A&M Records singles
Asylum Records singles